"Eighth Day" is a song by British singer-songwriter Hazel O'Connor, released in August 1980 as the second single from her debut and soundtrack album, Breaking Glass. It reached no. 5 on the UK Singles Charts, making it her first top-ten hit and her highest chart placing to date. The song was also certified silver in the UK by the BPI.

O'Connor wrote the song twelve hours before it was recorded as a parallel story of the Book of Genesis where Man made the Earth in his own image, and "having unleashed elements he cannot control, the Man-made Machine Monster takes over".

Reception 
Writing in Record Mirror, Simon Ludgate described the song as "the worst track from the album" with its release "something to do with a strong visual appeal because of the accompanying film clip". He said it "sounds like a latter-day 'Messiah'" and that "Monsters in Disguise" should have been released as a single instead. However, in the same magazine issue, reviewer Gill Pringle said "I'm impressed. Because I'm enjoying this record so much, I've suppressed the cringe that keeps welling up inside of me, everytime I think too hard about the modernistic touch of this record."

Charts

References

1980 songs
1980 singles
Hazel O'Connor songs

A&M Records singles
Song recordings produced by Tony Visconti